"A Little Bit of Soap", written by Bert Berns (aka Bert Russell), was a song, first sung in a bluesy soul style by the Jarmels, who reached number 12 with it in September 1961 and number 7 on the R&B charts.  The song has been covered by many other artists.

Reception
While the song was a moderate hit in the United States all three times it was released, it reached the Top Ten on the Canadian charts, and Top Twenty in Australia in 1970 for Paul Davis. It was his first charting single release.
"A Little Bit of Soap" was a huge hit in southeast Asia when the Hong Kong-based group Cliff Foenander and the Fabulous Echoes released it as a single. It spent 25 weeks at number 1 in top ten charts in 1963 in southeast Asia. Foenander and the Fabulous Echoes also sang the hit in Las Vegas, USA, in 1964. It made Cliff Foenander a household name in South Asia: Radio Ceylon, the oldest radio station in South Asia, played the number one hit across the Indian subcontinent.

Remakes
Garnet Mimms' 1964 remake of "A Little Bit of Soap" - produced by Jerry Ragovoy - reached number 95 on the Billboard Hot 100 in January 1965 
The song's composer Bert Berns produced a 1965 remake by the Exciters which reached number 58 on the Billboard Hot 100 in February 1966. 
Paul Davis remade the song in 1970: recorded at Muscle Shoals Sound Studio this version - co-produced by Davis with Bert Berns' widow Ilene Berns - reached number 52 on the Billboard Hot 100 in the summer of 1970
The Pioneers released a reggae version of "A Little Bit of Soap" in 1973 on Trojan Records. 
Nigel Olsson's version hit number 34 on the Billboard Hot 100 and number 9 on the Adult Contemporary chart in June 1979.  The versions by the Exciters, Paul Davis and Nigel Olsson were all recorded for Bang Records, the label which Bert Berns had founded in 1965.  
Showaddywaddy released a version of "A Little Bit of Soap" in 1978, affording the song its sole appearance on the UK Singles Chart as it reached No. 5 in July 1978.
Daniel Johnston also covered it.

Samples
De La Soul sampled it for a different song with the same name.

Popular culture
The song was featured in the 2019 Netflix film El Camino: A Breaking Bad movie.

References

1961 songs
1961 singles
1963 singles
1970 debut singles
1979 singles
Songs written by Bert Berns
The Jarmels songs
The Exciters songs
Paul Davis (singer) songs
Nigel Olsson songs
Bang Records singles
Laurie Records singles
Arista Records singles
Showaddywaddy songs